Anton Zwerina (7 June 1900 – 19 May 1973) was an Austrian weightlifter who competed at the 1924 Summer Olympics. He won a silver medal in the lightweight class.

References

External links
Profile

1900 births
1973 deaths
Austrian male weightlifters
Weightlifters at the 1924 Summer Olympics
Olympic weightlifters of Austria
Olympic silver medalists for Austria
Olympic medalists in weightlifting
Medalists at the 1924 Summer Olympics
20th-century Austrian people